"Don't Go Breaking My Heart" is a 1976 duet by English musician Elton John and English singer Kiki Dee. It was written by John with Bernie Taupin under the pseudonyms "Ann Orson" and "Carte Blanche", respectively, and intended as an affectionate pastiche of the Motown style, notably the various duets recorded by Marvin Gaye and singers such as Tammi Terrell and Kim Weston.

John and Taupin originally intended to record the song with Dusty Springfield, but ultimately withdrew the offer; Springfield's partner Sue Cameron later said this was because she was too ill at the time.

In 1994, John released the song as a duet with American drag queen RuPaul. It was produced by Giorgio Moroder and reached number three on the US Billboard Dance Club Songs chart.

Reception
Cash Box said that "there are some great harmonies in the chorus" and that John and Dee "seem perfectly wedded in this tune." Record World called it "a duet of rare simplicity and charm with James Newton-Howard's strings practically dancing out of the grooves."

Chart performance

Writers John and Taupin received the 1976 Ivor Novello award for Best Song Musically and Lyrically.

Unlike many of John's singles from the 1970s, it was never included on an original album (although it was recorded during the Blue Moves sessions), but was subsequently released as the third single on the album Duets, in early 1994. This version of the song was recorded with RuPaul and reached number seven on the UK Singles Chart and number one in Iceland.

"Don't Go Breaking My Heart" was the first No. 1 single in the UK for both John and Kiki Dee, topping the chart for six weeks in mid 1976. John would not enjoy a solo British chart-topper until "Sacrifice" in 1990. It also became his sixth No. 1 single in the US, topping the Billboard Hot 100 for four weeks and spent one week on the Easy Listening chart. Billboard ranked it as the No. 2 song for 1976, giving him his second consecutive appearance in the Billboard Year-end Top 3. In the U.S., it has been certified platinum by the Recording Industry Association of America. After this duet with Dee, John failed to have another US solo number one single until "Candle in the Wind 1997". This 21-year period included two intervening number one hits in America with musical partners: "That's What Friends Are For" by Dionne & Friends in 1986, and a 1992 re-make of John's "Don't Let the Sun Go Down on Me" with George Michael credited as a duet.

The B-side, "Snow Queen", was supposedly inspired by Cher, with John quoting past Sonny & Cher hits "I Got You Babe" and "The Beat Goes On", as well as the solo Cher song "Bang Bang (My Baby Shot Me Down)" during the fadeout of the song.

In 1977, John guest-starred on The Muppet Show and performed the track with Miss Piggy. In 1985, John and Dee performed the track to the crowd at Wembley Stadium during John's set at Live Aid (where Dee sang backup). In 1987, John appeared with Minnie Mouse on the NBC series Totally Minnie miming to the track. He performed the track with Alan Partridge (Steve Coogan) at the 2001 British Comedy awards. He also performed it with the Spice Girls on his ITV tribute programme An Audience with ... Elton John.

In June 2013, 37 years after its original release, the single reached one million sales in the UK.

The B-side, "Snow Queen", remained unavailable on CD outside Australia until April 2019 when it was included as a bonus track on the reissue of Kiki Dee's Cage the Songbird album, included in the 5-CD box set The Rocket Years. In May 2019 it was also included on the 3-CD box set Gold, a retrospective of Dee's career spanning various labels. In 2020, it was also included on Elton John's 8-CD box set Jewel Box.

Personnel
Based on information on the Elton John official website.
 Elton John – lead vocals and backing vocals, electric piano
 Kiki Dee – lead vocals and backing vocals
 James Newton Howard – acoustic piano and orchestral arrangements
 Caleb Quaye – electric guitar
 Kenny Passarelli – bass
 Roger Pope – drums
 Ray Cooper – tambourine, congas and bongos
 Kiki Dee, Curt Boettcher, Cindy Bullens, Ken Gold, Jon Joyce – uncredited backing vocals

Charts

Weekly singles charts

Year-end charts

All-time charts

Sales and certifications

Elton John and RuPaul version

  
In 1994, Elton John and American drag queen, actor, model, singer, songwriter, and television personality RuPaul released the song as a duet. It was produced by Giorgio Moroder and released as the third single from John's first collaboration album, Duets (1993). The song reached number three on the US Billboard Dance Club Songs chart. In Europe, it peaked at number-one in Iceland and within the top 10 in Portugal and the UK, the top 20 in Denmark, Ireland and Italy, and the top 30 in Austria, France and Switzerland. On the Eurochart Hot 100, "Don't Go Breaking My Heart" peaked at number 18 in March 1994. Outside Europe, the song reached number 39 in New Zealand, number 45 in Australia, and number 92 on the Billboard Hot 100 in the US.

Critical reception
AllMusic editor Stephen Thomas Erlewine described the song as a "kitschy number". Larry Flick from Billboard wrote that John recreates his classic Kiki Dee duet with "the world's favorite drag queen. Revamped quasi-rave/hi-NRG version of the track is way stronger than the less-than-pleasing mix on John's current collection, rendering it a formidable contender for action on both dancefloors and radio. Oodles of good fun." Dave Sholin from the Gavin Report commented, "Thanks to producer Giorgio Moroder, there's a few more beats per minute, as well as a hilarious video, and a super performance of a great tune." Alan Jones from Music Week gave it four out of five, calling it "somewhat soulessly produced" and a "smash-bound but tacky remake". John Kilgo from The Network Forty stated that this remake of the previous number-one smash "is for real..." Sam Wood from Philadelphia Inquirer viewed it as "a campy techno remake" of John's 1977 hit. Tom Doyle from Smash Hits gave it one out of five, saying that the music "sounds like it was done with the help of a Gameboy running low on batteries". Charles Aaron from Spin wrote, "If I'd known he was gearing up for world domination, I never would've given Ru so much guff for his café au lait complexion, blond ambition, and cosmetic tinkering. Keep those techno bon mots coming. Star booty forever."

Music video
A music video was produced to promote the single, featuring Elton John and RuPaul, directed by Randy Barbota. The video was later published on John's official YouTube channel in December 2016, and had generated more than three million views as of January 2023.

Track listing

Charts

Weekly charts

Year-end charts

Other versions
The musical comedy troupe the Capitol Steps recorded a parody of the song, in which then President George W. Bush is told by his wife Laura Bush, "Don't go faking you're smart".

Notes

References

1976 singles
Songs with music by Elton John
Songs with lyrics by Bernie Taupin
Elton John songs
Kiki Dee songs
RuPaul songs
Billboard Hot 100 number-one singles
Cashbox number-one singles
European Hot 100 Singles number-one singles
UK Singles Chart number-one singles
Male–female vocal duets
Song recordings produced by Gus Dudgeon
The Rocket Record Company singles
1976 songs
1994 songs
Works published under a pseudonym
MCA Records singles
Number-one singles in Australia
Number-one singles in Iceland
RPM Top Singles number-one singles
Irish Singles Chart number-one singles
Number-one singles in New Zealand
Number-one singles in South Africa